Walter A. Thompson (May 8, 1903 – December 17, 1975) was an American film editor with 69 film credits from 1930 to 1975. He was nominated twice for the Academy Award for Best Film Editing for This Above All (1942) and for The Nun's Story (1959). He was also nominated for an ACE Eddie Award for The Wonderful World of the Brothers Grimm (1962).

Thompson shared his last credit, Farewell, My Lovely (1975), with Joel Cox. It was Cox's first credit as an editor; he has gone on to a distinguished career working primarily with director Clint Eastwood.

Selected filmography
Tundra (1936)
Guilty of Treason (1950)
The Nun's Story (1959)
Behold a Pale Horse (1964)
King Rat (1965)
Walk, Don't Run (1966)
Model Shop (1969)
The Todd Killings (1971)
Fat City (1972)
The Paper Chase (1973)
Farewell My Lovely (1975)

References

External links

1903 births
1975 deaths
American film editors